Wormer Lake is located in Waterford Township, Michigan. The 27.2-acre lake lies north of Walton Blvd. near Clintonville Rd. 
At its deepest point, the lake is 24 feet deep.

Wormer Lake connects to Mohawk Lake and to Schoolhouse Lake.

Fish
Fish in Wormer Lake include largemouth basses, bluegills, and yellow perches.

References

Lakes of Oakland County, Michigan
Lakes of Michigan
Lakes of Waterford Township, Michigan